Picturesque America was a two-volume set of books describing and illustrating the scenery of America, which grew out of an earlier series in Appleton's Journal. It was published by D. Appleton and Company of New York in 1872 and 1874 and edited by the romantic poet and journalist William Cullen Bryant (1794-1878), who also edited the New York Evening Post. The layout and concept was similar to that of Picturesque Europe. The work's essays, together with its nine hundred wood engravings and fifty steel engravings, are considered to have had a profound influence on the growth of tourism and the historic preservation movement in the United States.

The preface described "the design of this publication to present full descriptions and elaborate pictorial delineations of the scenery characteristic of all the different parts of our country. The wealth of material for this purpose is almost boundless."

This two-volume set and others of the same genre, achieved great popularity in the nineteenth century. Their illustrations provided a tour of nineteenth century America, unspoilt and pastoral, its centres of commerce, ports, architecture and natural treasures. In a modern (2001) treatment of the work, Sue Rainey, who is a historian of American graphic arts and has a particular interest in the artists who drew landscapes and cityscapes for periodical and book illustrations,  wrote "As the first publication to celebrate the entire continental nation, it enabled Americans, after the trauma of the Civil War, to construct a national self-image based on reconciliation between North and South and incorporation of the West." (p. xiii) The volumes display both steel and wood engravings based on the paintings of some of the best American landscape painters of the nineteenth century, primarily Harry Fenn and his friend Douglas Woodward, but also including John Frederick Kensett, William Stanley Haseltine, James David Smillie, John William Casilear, Thomas Moran, A. C. Warren, David Johnson, Granville Perkins, Felix Octavius Carr Darley, Albert Fitch Bellows, James McDougal Hart, Casimir Clayton Griswold (1834-1918), Worthington Whittredge, Charles G. Rosenberg (1818 - 1879), William Ludwell Sheppard (1833-1912), Homer Dodge Martin, Alfred Rudolph Waud, William Hart, Robert Swain Gifford, Jules Tavernier, William Hamilton Gibson, and Thomas Cole.

Engravers included Robert Hinshelwood (1812-1885), Edward Paxman Brandard (1819-1898), Samuel Valentine Hunt (1803-1893), William Wellstood (1819-1900), William Chapin (1802-1888), Henry Bryan Hall (1808-1884).
Robert Hinshelwood was born in Edinburgh in 1812 and emigrated to America in 1835 where he became renowned for his landscapes, etchings and engravings. His meticulous attention to detail was appreciated by publishing houses such as Appleton's and Harper's, and also by the Continental Bank Note Company who employed him to produce plates for the printing of currency. He died in New York.

Volume I engravings

 On the Coast of Maine
 St. John's and Ocklawaha Rivers
 Up and Down the Columbia
 Lookout Mountain and the Tennessee
 Richmond, Scenic and Historic
 Natural Bridge, Virginia
 Delaware Water-Gap
 Mauch Chunk
 On the Savannah
 The French Broad
 The White Mountains
 Neversink Highlands
 St. Augustine, Florida
 Charleston and its Suburbs
 Weyer's Cave, Virginia
 Scenes on the Brandywine
 Cumberland Gap
 Watkins Glen
 Scenes on Eastern Long Island
 The Lower Mississippi
 Mackinac
 Our Great National Park
 Harper's Ferry
 Scenes in Virginia
 Newport
 West Virginia
 Lake Superior
 Northern California
 Niagara
 Trenton Falls
 The Yosemite Falls
 Providence and Vicinity
 South Shore of Lake Erie
 On the Coast of California.

Volume II engravings
 Highlands and Palisades of the Hudson
 Philadelphia and its Suburbs
 Northern New Jersey
 Valley of the Connecticut
 Baltimore and Environs
 The Catskills
 The Juniata
 On the Ohio
 The Plains and the Sierras
 The Susquehanna
 Boston
 Lake George and Lake Champlain
 Mount Mansfield
 Valley of the Housatonic
 The Upper Mississippi
 Valley of the Genesee
 St. Lawrence and the Saguenay
 Eastern Shore
 The Adirondack Region
 The Connecticut Shore of the Sound
 Lake Memphremagog
 The Mohawk, Albany and Troy
 The Upper Delaware
 Water-Falls at Cayuga Lake
 The Rocky Mountains
 The Canons of the Colorado
 Chicago and Milwaukee
 A Glance at the Northwest
 The Mammoth Cave
 New York and Brooklyn
 Washington

This ambitious work was published and delivered as a subscription; semi-monthly parts were sent out to subscribers. Once complete, the subscription would be bound into volumes.  A variety of bindings were available, from cloth-bound with leather corners at the low end to full Morocco leather bindings with elaborate tooling. The stately, bound two volume set was proudly displayed in parlors of subscriber homes as a show of status.

Nowadays, the publication frequently appears in antiquarian book collections; sometimes in pristine collection, but more frequently in poor condition.  Lower-quality examples are frequently disassembled, their engravings removed and sold separately.

See also
 Appleton's Journal, a monthly journal including many of the same artists
 The Aldine, a monthly journal of the same period established as a rival to Appleton's and employing many of the same artists
 Picturesque Europe
 Picturesque Palestine, Sinai, and Egypt

References

Citations

Bibliography
 .
 .
Sue Rainey - Creating Picturesque America (Applewood Books, 2001)

External links

Travel guide books
1872 books
1874 books
D. Appleton & Company books